The Atlantic Cup was a friendly game contested between the champions of the Icelandic Premier League and the champions of the Faroe Islands Premier League.

History

In 1999 the Icelandic Champions from 1998, IBV Vestmannaeyar, visited the Faroe Islands to play a match against the Faroese champions from 1998, HB Tórshavn. 
The match ended in a 2-2 draw, but because it was a cup game, it was decided on penalties (no extra time was played). The Icelandic team scored on all of their attempts, while the Faroese Champions missed their first penalty, and therefore IBV Vestmannaeyar won the shootout 5-3.

But it was HB who probably should have won the match, as they were leading both 1-0 and 2-1, but allowed IBV to equalize twice, the second equalizer was just 2 minutes from time.

HB had taken the lead through an Andrew av Fløtum goal after 27 minutes. The second half was only into the 1st minute before the teams were level again, because of a HB owngoal. However, HB took the lead again in the 70th minute, thanks to a Bjarki Mohr goal. But just 2 minutes from time, IBV were awarded a penalty, which Sindri Grétarsson converted from the spot to make it a 2-2 draw.

At this time, the cup had no name, but both clubs had enjoyed the match and people were talking about making it an annual meeting.

But no match was played for the next 3 years, then in 2002 the Faroe Islands Football Association, the Football Association of Iceland and the fund FITUR (which provides support to the furthering of cooperation between The Faroe Islands and Iceland, in order to promote further relations between the countries), decided to make it an annual event, that the champions of Faroese and Icelandic leagues should meet in what became the Atlantic Cup. The match was played the last weekend in April, alternating every year between the Faroe Islands, and Iceland.

In 2009 the competition was discontinued.

Matches

2002 Atlantic Cup

2003 Atlantic Cup

2004 Atlantic Cup

2005 Atlantic Cup

2006 Atlantic Cup

2007 Atlantic Cup

In 2007, the match between FH Hafnafjørdur and HB Tórshavn was cancelled. It was planned to take place in Reykjavík in March instead of April, but the fund FITUR, who had sponsored the event, closed down.

The trip to Iceland became too expensive for HB Tórshavn. So HB announced that they would not take part in the Atlantic Cup that year.

2008 Atlantic Cup

References

Football cup competitions in the Faroe Islands
International association football competitions hosted by Iceland
2002 in Icelandic football
2003 in Icelandic football
2004 in Icelandic football
2005 in Icelandic football
2006 in Icelandic football
2007 in Icelandic football
2008 in Icelandic football
2002 in Faroe Islands football
2003 in Faroe Islands football
2004 in Faroe Islands football
2005 in Faroe Islands football
2006 in Faroe Islands football
2007 in Faroe Islands football
2008 in Faroe Islands football